The Uniontown Historic District is a historic district in Uniontown, Alabama.  It is roughly bounded by Tomasene Street, Taylor Street, East Avenue, and Green Street.  It contains a variety of mid-to-late 19th and early 20th century architectural styles, most notably examples of Greek Revival, Queen Anne, and Classical Revival.  The district was added to the National Register of Historic Places on February 24, 2000.

References

Historic districts in Perry County, Alabama
National Register of Historic Places in Perry County, Alabama
Queen Anne architecture in Alabama
Greek Revival architecture in Alabama
Historic districts on the National Register of Historic Places in Alabama